Yuri Alexandrov (September 13, 1963 – January 2, 2013) was a Russian Soviet-era boxer who was World Amateur Flyweight Champion in 1982, and European Amateur Bantamweight Champion in 1983, as well as four-time champion of the USSR (1982, 1984, 1986,1987). He was unable to replicate this success in the Olympics, being excluded from the 1984 Los Angeles games by the Soviet boycott, and missing the 1988 games due to injury.

In 1989 Alexandrov briefly turned professional (the first Soviet boxer to do so), but did not meet with great success and retired in 1992. In 2001 he became vice-president of the Russian Professional Boxing Federation. He held this position until his death, from a heart attack, on 2 January 2013.

References

External links
 
   Article on Alexandrov's life

1963 births
2013 deaths
Bantamweight boxers
Flyweight boxers
Honoured Masters of Sport of the USSR
Soviet male boxers
AIBA World Boxing Championships medalists
Burials in Troyekurovskoye Cemetery